Douglas Elwin "Duke" Erikson (born January 15, 1951) is an American musician, songwriter, screenwriter, film producer and record producer, best known as a co-founder and guitarist of the alternative rock band Garbage. Garbage has sold more than 17 million albums worldwide.

Early life
Duke Erikson was born in Lyons, a small rural community in Nebraska. His first musical instrument was the piano, and his second was the guitar. At the age of 16 he joined his first band, The British, which was inspired by his passion for the British beat movement. Erikson operated the light show for The British which was constructed out of a cigar box and door hangers. "I ran that with my left hand while I played Farfisa organ with my right," he commented.

When Erikson completed high school, he attended Wayne State College where he studied drawing and painting, ultimately becoming a teaching assistant.

Musical career

1974–1985
Erikson formed the rock band Spooner in 1974 with two fellow musicians in Madison, Wisconsin. Erikson sang lead vocals, played keyboards and guitar, and became the band's principal songwriter, his compositions being described by City Lights as "strangely seductive" and "immediately draw[ing] in the listener". Spooner became a quartet when Butch Vig joined them on drums. Spooner released two well-received albums, Every Corner Dance and The Wildest Dreams, and toured across the Midwest. Rolling Stone magazine called their debut album "a convincing collection of sparkling pop music", to which "Erikson's edgy, poetic slice-of-small-town-life lyrics add a genuine, idiosyncratic touch".

In 1983, Erikson helped Vig and Steve Marker establish Smart Studios in Madison, where he helped to design the studio interior and where he has carried out engineering, production and remixing work for a series of local and international rock artists.

1986–1993
In 1986, Erikson collaborated again with Vig to form the garage-rock band Fire Town, in which he played guitar and contributed vocals. The band released two albums, In the Heart of the Heart Country and The Good Life, the latter on Atlantic Records. Rolling Stone praised their debut as "a striking, thoughtful album" with "killer harmonies".

While Fire Town had disbanded by 1989, Spooner had an unexpected late resurgence: their single "Mean Old World" became a hit, prompting them to re-form, make a new album – The Fugitive Dance – and embark on a tour before they disbanded in 1993.

1994–present

After Marker saw singer Shirley Manson performing with her band Angelfish on MTV's 120 Minutes in 1994, he persuaded Erikson and Vig that they should audition her for their new band, which became Garbage. Erikson co-wrote the band's seven albums, contributing guitar, keyboards, and bass. The albums have sold more than 17 million copies worldwide.

In a major feature on the band for The Sunday Times in 1998, the British journalist Tony Barrell described Erikson's persona in Garbage as "the cool dude with the goatee and the Mr Spockish demeanour". Though sometimes a taciturn presence in the band, Erikson has been known to contribute an air of dry humour to media interviews. During a discussion in 1996 about the interpersonal chemistry within Garbage, he deadpanned: "We have a little room where we go and cry."

Erikson's other projects include the production of other artists. He produced the single "If You Go" by the Greenlandic singer Simon Lynge, which received regular airplay in Britain during 2011 after being added to the BBC Radio 2 playlist.

Erikson is on the board of directors of the acclaimed UK independent record label Lo-Max Records, which is home to The Wrens, The Go-Betweens, Kevin Ayers, and Simon Lynge. In 2017 he co-produced and worked extensively on sound restoration for the American Epic series as well as co-producing the music for The American Epic Sessions.

Erikson's daughter, Roxy Erickson, is a photographer based in London, England.

Discography

Spooner
Cruel School E.P. (1979)
Every Corner Dance (1982)
Wildest Dreams (1985)
The Fugitive Dance (1990)

Fire Town
In the Heart of the Heart Country (1987)
The Good Life (1989)

Garbage
Studio albums
Garbage (1995)
Version 2.0 (1998)
Beautiful Garbage (2001)
Bleed Like Me (2005)
Not Your Kind of People (2012)
Strange Little Birds (2016)
No Gods No Masters (2021)

Compilation albums
Special Collection (2002)
Absolute Garbage (2007)

Film career 
In 2006 Erikson co-founded Lo-Max Films and was the co-creator, producer and co-writer of the Emmy Award nominated American Epic documentary film series. The films covered the first recordings of roots music in the United States during the 1920s and their cultural, social and technological impact on North America and the world. The series involved ten years of field research and has been sited as one of the best music documentaries ever made.

Erikson co-produced and co-wrote The American Epic Sessions, an award-winning musical film, directed by Bernard MacMahon, in which an engineer restores the fabled long-lost first electrical sound recording system from 1925, and twenty contemporary artists pay tribute to the momentous machine by attempting to record songs on it for the first time in 80 years. The film starred Steve Martin, Nas, Elton John, Alabama Shakes, Willie Nelson, Merle Haggard, Jack White, Taj Mahal, Ana Gabriel, Pokey LaFarge, Rhiannon Giddens and Beck.

In September 2017 the University of Chicago Laboratory Schools announced a nine-month preschool to high school educational program based on Erikson’s American Epic films beginning on 6 October 2017. The school, founded by American educator John Dewey in 1896, has over 2,015 students enrolled in 15 grades.

Erikson is a member of the Academy of Television Arts & Sciences, the Writers Guild of America West. He is the co-founder of Lo-Max Films, along with film director Bernard MacMahon and producer Allison McGourty.

Awards and honors 
Erikson’s American Epic documentary series and The American Epic Sessions have received numerous awards, including the Foxtel Audience Award at the Sydney Film Festival, the Audience Award at the Calgary International Film Festival and a nomination for a Primetime Emmy. On April 23, 2018, the Focal International Awards nominated Erikson for Best Use of Footage in a History Feature and Best Use of Footage in a Music Production.

Filmography

References

Bibliography 
 Thompson, Dave. Alternative Rock: Third Ear - The Essential Listening Companion. London. Backbeat, 2000.

External links

 
 Garbage - official website
American Epic - official website

1951 births
People from Lyons, Nebraska
Guitarists from Nebraska
Garbage (band) members
American male guitarists
20th-century American guitarists
Writers Guild of America
American film producers
American screenwriters
Living people
21st-century American writers